The 1948 Polish Speedway season was the 1948 season of motorcycle speedway in Poland.

Individual

Polish Individual Speedway Championship
The individual event was cancelled.

Start list
Kraków, October 24

First league
Jan Wąsikowski – PKM Warszawa (35)
Józef Olejniczak – LKM Leszno (32)
Jan Najdrowski – Olimpia Grudziądz (31)
Jerzy Dąbrowski – PKM Warszawa (30)
Alfred Smoczyk – LKM Leszno (29)
Jan Krakowiak – DKS Łódź (28)
Tadeusz Zwoliński – Olimpia Grudziądz (26)
Marian Rejek – KM Ostrów Wlkp. (26)
Tadeusz Kołeczek – Tramwajarz Łódź (25)
Stefan Maciejewski – KM Ostrów Wlkp. (24)
Czesław Szałkowski – Olimpia Grudziądz (24)
Władysław Kamrowski – GKM Gdańsk (21)
Second league
Jerzy Jankowski – Polonia Bytom (35)
Jan Filipczak – Legia Warszawa (26)
Bogusław Osowiecki – Legia Warszawa (25)
Jan Paluch – Polonia Bytom (24)

Points in League events

Team

Team Speedway Polish Championship
The 1948 Team Speedway Polish Championship season was the first season of the contest used to determine the Polish team champions. PKM Warszawa were crowned the first winners of the competition.

Rules

Composition First and Second Leagues were established after qualifications with three rounds. Every team consisted of three riders, but only one were exposed to every round. Every event consisted of 20 races. Score was 4–3–2–1 and 0 it no-completion heat. Engine capacity was not considered.

First, Second and Third League included 9 teams. Matches were played with part three teams. Terms were made up of six drivers plus reserve. Game consisted with 9 races. In one day were played 3 three-cornered matches. For winning match team received 3 points, for second place 2 points and for third 1 point. The drivers with the main squad of a team started in the match three times. The quantity of small points was added up.

First and Second Leagues 

Medalists

Third League (Local) 
Only teams from Greater Poland (Poznań district) participated in Poznań District League. (Poznańska Liga Okręgowa). ZZK Poznań played only in first round and was replaced by Unia Zielona Góra.

References

Poland Individual
Poland Team
Speedway